Sullom Voe is an inlet of the North Sea between the parishes of Delting and Northmavine in Shetland, Scotland. It is a location of the Sullom Voe oil terminal and Shetland Gas Plant. The word Voe is from the Old Norse  and denotes a small bay or narrow creek. The head of the voe makes up the eastern side of Mavis Grind.

The Voe, the longest in Shetland, and partially sheltered by the island of Yell was used as a military airfield during World War II both by the Royal Air Force and the Royal Norwegian Air Force as a location for flying boats. With the coming of the oil terminal, the remains of the airfield were upgraded and modernised to create Scatsta Airport which was primarily used to service the terminal.

The first crude oil was discovered in the North Sea in 1969, and soon thereafter construction began on the oil terminal at Sullom Voe, north east of the village of Brae, which became operational in 1975 and was completed in 1982, becoming the largest in Europe. Oil flows via pipeline from the Brent and Ninian oil fields to be loaded onto tankers at Sullom Voe. It has recently begun to serve North Atlantic oil fields as well.

When Shetland was identified as a location to provide pipeline terminal and support facilities for off-shore oil installations in the northern North Sea, corporations involved had expected to each build their own terminal facilities. However, wishing to minimise the negative impacts of the industry, the Shetland Islands Council (SIC), with power granted to it by the UK Parliament in the Zetland County Council Act 1974, were able to contain all pipeline terminal facilities at the Sullom Voe site, now operated by EnQuest on behalf of a consortium of companies operating in the North Sea and North Atlantic.

Footnotes

Fjards of Scotland
Ports and harbours of Scotland
Special Areas of Conservation in Scotland
North Sea
Voes of Shetland
Northmavine